Karate at the 2009 Southeast Asian Games was held at Chao Anouvong Gymnasium from 10 to 12 December 2009 in Vientiane, Laos.

Medal summary

Medalists

Kata

Kumite

Men

Women

External links
 Games Result System: Official Result of the 25th Southeast Asian Games Vientiane 2009
 25th SEA Games Official Report

2009 Southeast Asian Games events
2009